Joan London is the name of:

 Joan London (Australian author) (born 1948), Australian fiction author 
 Joan London (American writer) (1901–1971), California author and daughter of Jack London
 Joan London (EastEnders), character in the British TV drama EastEnders

See also
 Joan Lunden, American TV personality